Interview with History (Intervista con la storia in Italian) is a book consisting of interviews by the Italian journalist and author Oriana Fallaci (1929–2006), one of the most controversial interviewers of her time. She interviewed many world leaders of the time.

Interviews with fourteen leaders appeared in this book and in the following order of presentation:

Henry Kissinger
Ngyen Van Thieu
General Giap
Golda Meir
Yasser Arafat
Hussein of Jordan
Indira Gandhi 
Ali Bhutto
Willy Brandt
Pietro Nenni
Mohammed Riza Pahlavi
Helder Camara
Archbishop Makarios
Alexandros Panagoulis

Publishing history
Intervista con la storia, Milan: Rizzoli, 1973; reprinted Milan: Rizzoli, 1974 (Biblioteca Universale Rizzoli).
Interview With History, New York: Liveright Publishing Corporation, 1976, translated from the Italian into English by John Shepley; first British edition: London: Michael Joseph, 1976; reprinted Boston: Houghton Mifflin Company, 1977, .
Expanded and revised Italian edition: Intervista con la storia nuova edizione ampliata e riveduta, Milano: Biblioteca Universale Rizzoli, 1985.

External links
The Interview that Became Henry Kissinger’s “Most Disastrous Decision”: How Oriana Fallaci Became the Most Feared Political Interviewer in the World

References

1976 books
Italian books
Works by Oriana Fallaci